Edward P. Evans, also known as Ned Evans, (January 31, 1942 – December 31, 2010) was an American heir, businessman, investor, horse breeder and philanthropist. He was the chairman and CEO of Macmillan Publishers from 1979 to 1989. He was the owner of Spring Hill Farm, a horse farm in Fauquier County, Virginia. He is the namesake of Edward P. Evans Hall, the main building  at the Yale School of Management.

Early life
Edward P. Evans was born on January 31, 1942, in Pittsburgh, Pennsylvania. His father, Thomas Mellon Evans, was a corporate raider, horse breeder and philanthropist. He had two brothers.

Evans was educated at the Phillips Academy. He earned a bachelor's degree from Yale University in 1964 and a master in business administration from the Harvard Business School in 1967.

Business career

Evans began his career by working for his father. By the 1970s, he became the chairman and chief executive officer of one of his family businesses, H.K. Porter, Inc. He acquired 15% of Macmillan Publishers in 1979 and served as its chairman and CEO until 1989, when he sold it to the Maxwell Communication Corporation for $2.8 billion. He subsequently became an investor.

Equine interests
Evans was the owner of Spring Hill Farm, a 2,800-acre horse farm near Casanova in Fauquier County, Virginia. His 250 horses included Saint Liam, Quality Road, Minstrella, Summer Colony and Gygistar. According to Glenn Petty of the Virginia Thoroughbred Association, "Since entering the business in the 1970’s, Evans (and a very few select partners over the years) has produced the earners of more than $75 million."

Evans was a member of The Jockey Club. According to The Blood-Horse, "He was recognized by the Thoroughbred Owners and Breeders Association as Virginia’s Breeder of the Year 10 times, most recently in 2010, and he was TOBA’s National Breeder of the Year in 2009."

Death and legacy
Evans died of leukemia on December 31, 2010, at the Mount Sinai Hospital in New York City. Shortly before his death, Evans donated $50 million to the Yale School of Management at his alma mater, Yale University, where the Edward P. Evans Hall was named in his honor.

References

1942 births
2010 deaths
People from Fauquier County, Virginia
Phillips Academy alumni
Yale University alumni
Benefactors of Yale University
Harvard Business School alumni
American chief executives
American chairpersons of corporations
American investors
American racehorse owners and breeders
Deaths from leukemia
20th-century philanthropists
Mellon family